17beta dehydrogenase or 17β dehydrogenase may refer to:

Estradiol 17beta-dehydrogenase
Testosterone 17beta-dehydrogenase
17β-Hydroxysteroid dehydrogenase (17β-HSD, HSD17B), also 17-ketosteroid reductases (17-KSR)